The Tibetan Plateau  (also known as the Qinghai–Tibet Plateau or the Qing–Zang Plateau or as the Himalayan Plateau in India, is a vast elevated plateau located at the intersection of Central, South and East Asia covering most of the Tibet Autonomous Region, most of Qinghai, western half of Sichuan, Southern Gansu provinces in Western China, southern Xinjiang, Bhutan, the Indian regions of Ladakh and Lahaul and Spiti (Himachal Pradesh) as well as Gilgit-Baltistan in Pakistan, northwestern Nepal, eastern Tajikistan and southern Kyrgyzstan. With an average elevation exceeding  and being surrounded by imposing mountain ranges that harbor the world's two highest summits, Mount Everest and K2, the Tibetan Plateau is often referred to as "the Roof of the World".

The Tibetan Plateau contains the headwaters of the drainage basins of most of the streams and rivers in surrounding regions. This includes the three longest rivers in Asia (the Yellow, Yangtze, and Mekong). Its tens of thousands of glaciers and other geographical and ecological features serve as a "water tower" storing water and maintaining flow. It is sometimes termed the Third Pole because its ice fields contain the largest reserve of fresh water outside the polar regions. The impact of climate change on the Tibetan Plateau is of ongoing scientific interest.

Description 
The Tibetan Plateau is surrounded by the massive mountain ranges of high-mountain Asia. The plateau is bordered to the south by the inner Himalayan range, to the north by the Kunlun Mountains, which separate it from the Tarim Basin, and to the northeast by the Qilian Mountains, which separate the plateau from the Hexi Corridor and Gobi Desert. To the east and southeast the plateau gives way to the forested gorge and ridge geography of the mountainous headwaters of the Salween, Mekong, and Yangtze rivers in northwest Yunnan and western Sichuan (the Hengduan Mountains). In the west, the curve of the rugged Karakoram range of northern Kashmir embraces the plateau. The Indus River originates in the western Tibetan Plateau in the vicinity of Lake Manasarovar.

Along the escarpment is a range of mountains. In the west, the Kunlun Mountains separate the plateau from the Tarim Basin. About halfway across the Tarim the bounding range becomes the Altyn-Tagh and the Kunluns, by convention, continue somewhat to the south. In the 'V' formed by this split is the western part of the Qaidam Basin. The Altyn-Tagh ends near the Dangjin pass on the Dunhuang–Golmud road. To the west are short ranges called the Danghe, Yema, Shule, and Tulai Nanshans. The easternmost range is the Qilian Mountains. The line of mountains continues east of the plateau as the Qinling, which separates the Ordos Plateau from Sichuan. North of the mountains runs the Gansu or Hexi Corridor which was the main silk-road route from China proper to the West.

The plateau is a high-altitude arid steppe interspersed with mountain ranges and large brackish lakes. The southern and eastern edges of the steppe have grasslands that can sustainably support populations of nomadic herdsmen, although frost occurs for six months of the year. Permafrost occurs over extensive parts of the plateau. Proceeding to the north and northwest, the plateau becomes progressively higher, colder, and drier, until reaching the remote Changtang region in the northwestern part of the plateau. As a result of this extremely inhospitable environment, the Changthang region (together with the adjoining Kekexili region) is the least populous region in Asia and the third least populous area in the world after Antarctica and northern Greenland.

Geology and geological history 

The geological history of the Tibetan Plateau is closely related to that of the Himalayas. The Himalayas belong to the Alpine Orogeny and are therefore among the younger mountain ranges on the planet, consisting mostly of uplifted sedimentary and metamorphic rock. Their formation is a result of a continental collision or orogeny along the convergent boundary between the Indo-Australian Plate and the Eurasian Plate.

About 50 million years ago, this fast-moving Indo-Australian plate had completely closed the Tethys Ocean, the existence of which has been determined by sedimentary rocks settled on the ocean floor, and the volcanoes that fringed its edges. Since these sediments were light, they crumpled into mountain ranges rather than sinking to the floor. During this early stage of its formation in the Late Palaeogene, Tibet consisted of a deep palaeovalley bounded by multiple mountain ranges rather than the more topographically uniform elevated flatland that it is today. The Tibetan Plateau's mean elevation continued to vary since its initial uplift in the Eocene; isotopic records show the plateau's altitude was around 3,000 metres above sea level around the Oligocene-Miocene boundary and that it fell by 900 metres between 25.5 and 21.6 million years ago, attributable to tectonic unroofing from east-west extension or to erosion from climatic weathering. The plateau subsequently rose by 500 to 1,000 metres between 21.6 to 20.4 million years ago. Palaeobotanical evidence indicates that the Nujiang Suture Zone and the Yarlung-Zangpo Suture Zone remained tropical or subtropical lowlands until the latest Oligocene or Early Miocene, enabling biotic interchange across Tibet. The age of east-west grabens in the Lhasa and Himalaya terranes suggests that the plateau's elevation was close to its modern altitude by around 14 to 8 million years ago.

Much of the Tibetan Plateau is of relatively low relief. The cause of this is debated among geologists. Some argue that the Tibetan Plateau is an uplifted peneplain formed at low altitude, while others argue that the low relief stems from erosion and infill of topographic depressions that occurred at already high elevations.

The current tectonics of the plateau is much debated. The two end-member models are the block model, in which the crust of the plateau is formed of several blocks with little internal deformation separated by major strike-slip faults. In the alternative continuum model, the plateau is affected by distributed deformation resulting from flow within the crust.

Environment

The Tibetan Plateau supports a variety of ecosystems, most of them classified as montane grasslands. While parts of the plateau feature an alpine tundra-like environment, other areas feature monsoon-influenced shrublands and forests. Species diversity is generally reduced on the plateau due to the elevation and low precipitation. The Tibetan Plateau hosts the Tibetan wolf, and species of snow leopard, wild yak, wild donkey, cranes, vultures, hawks, geese, snakes, and water buffalo.

Ecoregions found on the Tibetan Plateau, as defined by the World Wide Fund for Nature, are as follows:
 The Pamir alpine desert and tundra covers the western end of the Tibetan Plateau where it transitions to the Pamir Mountains
 The North Tibetan Plateau–Kunlun Mountains alpine desert covers the northwestern limits of the Tibetan Plateau along the Kunlun Mountains
 The Karakoram–West Tibetan Plateau alpine steppe covers the westernmost parts of the Tibetan Plateau and Ladakh
 The Northwestern Himalayan alpine shrub and meadows on the edges mountains bordering the extreme west of the Tibetan Plateau
 The Central Tibetan Plateau alpine steppe covers most of the central portions of the Tibetan Plateau and the eastern Changtang
 The Western Himalayan alpine shrub and meadows covers the southwestern plateau in the Garuda Valley region
 The Qaidam Basin semi-desert located in the Qaidam Basin on the northern Tibetan Plateau
 The Qilian Mountains subalpine meadows covering the Qilian Mountains in the northernmost portions of the plateau
 The Qilian Mountains conifer forests covering parts of the mountain ranges in the northeastern Tibetan Plateau
 The Tibetan Plateau alpine shrublands and meadows covering a swath of the central and northeastern Tibetan Plateau
 The Yarlung Tsangpo arid steppe in the Yarlung Tsangpo river Valley, where most of the permanent human population on the Tibetan Plateau lives
 The Eastern Himalayan alpine shrub and meadows cover the southern Tibetan Plateau on the north side of the Himalayas
 The Southeast Tibet shrub and meadows cover the southeastern and eastern parts of the plateau and are generally rainier than the other high-altitude Tibetan Plateau regions
 The Northeastern Himalayan subalpine conifer forests reach up mountain valleys in the southern plateau and contain some of the highest altitude forests in the world
 The Nujiang Lancang Gorge alpine conifer and mixed forests cover the mountain valleys that reach  into the southeastern Tibetan Plateau
 The Hengduan Mountains subalpine conifer forests cover the southeasternmost mountain valleys on the plateau
 The Qionglai–Minshan conifer forests cover the eastern edges of the plateau and are the densest forests to be found anywhere on the Tibetan Plateau

Human history 

Nomads on the Tibetan Plateau and in the Himalayas are the remainders of nomadic practices historically once widespread in Asia and Africa. Pastoral nomads constitute about 40% of the ethnic Tibetan population. The presence of nomadic peoples on the plateau is predicated on their adaptation to survival on the world's grassland by raising livestock rather than crops, which are unsuitable to the terrain. Archaeological evidence suggests that the earliest human occupation of the plateau occurred between 30,000 and 40,000 years ago. Since colonization of the Tibetan Plateau, Tibetan culture has adapted and flourished in the western, southern, and eastern regions of the plateau. The northern portion, the Changtang, is generally too high and cold to support permanent population. One of the most notable civilizations to have developed on the Tibetan Plateau is the Tibetan Empire from the 7th century to the 9th century AD.

Impact on other regions

Role in monsoons 

Monsoons are caused by the different amplitudes of surface temperature seasonal cycles between land and oceans. This differential warming occurs because heating rates differ between land and water. Ocean heating is distributed vertically through a "mixed layer" that may be 50 meters deep through the action of wind and buoyancy-generated turbulence, whereas the land surface conducts heat slowly, with the seasonal signal penetrating only a meter or so. Additionally, the specific heat capacity of liquid water is significantly greater than that of most materials that make up land. Together, these factors mean that the heat capacity of the layer participating in the seasonal cycle is much larger over the oceans than over land, with the consequence that the land warms and cools faster than the ocean. In turn, air over the land warms faster and reaches a higher temperature than does air over the ocean. The warmer air over land tends to rise, creating an area of low pressure. The pressure anomaly then causes a steady wind to blow toward the land, which brings the moist air over the ocean surface with it. Rainfall is then increased by the presence of the moist ocean air. The rainfall is stimulated by a variety of mechanisms, such as low-level air being lifted upwards by mountains, surface heating, convergence at the surface, divergence aloft, or from storm-produced outflows near the surface. When such lifting occurs, the air cools due to expansion in lower pressure, which in turn produces condensation and precipitation.

In winter, the land cools off quickly, but the ocean maintains the heat longer. The hot air over the ocean rises, creating a low-pressure area and a breeze from land to ocean while a large area of drying high pressure is formed over the land, increased by wintertime cooling. Monsoons are similar to sea and land breezes, a term usually referring to the localized, diurnal cycle of circulation near coastlines everywhere, but they are much larger in scale, stronger and seasonal. The seasonal monsoon wind shift and weather associated with the heating and cooling of the Tibetan plateau is the strongest such monsoon on Earth.

Glaciology: the Ice Age and at present

Today, Tibet is an important heating surface of the atmosphere. However, during the Last Glacial Maximum, an approximately  ice sheet covered the plateau. Due to its great extent, this glaciation in the subtropics was an important element of radiative forcing. With a much lower latitude, the ice in Tibet reflected at least four times more radiation energy per unit area into space than ice at higher latitudes. Thus, while the modern plateau heats the overlying atmosphere, during the Last Ice Age it helped to cool it.

This cooling had multiple effects on regional climate. Without the thermal low pressure caused by the heating, there was no monsoon over the Indian subcontinent. This lack of monsoon caused extensive rainfall over the Sahara, expansion of the Thar Desert, more dust deposited into the Arabian Sea, and a lowering of the biotic life zones on the Indian subcontinent. Animals responded to this shift in climate, with the Javan rusa migrating into India.

In addition, the glaciers in Tibet created meltwater lakes in the Qaidam Basin, the Tarim Basin, and the Gobi Desert, despite the strong evaporation caused by the low latitude. Silt and clay from the glaciers accumulated in these lakes; when the lakes dried at the end of the ice age, the silt and clay were blown by the downslope wind off the Plateau. These airborne fine grains produced the enormous amount of loess in the Chinese lowlands.

Effects of climate change

The Tibetan Plateau contains the world's third-largest store of ice. Qin Dahe, the former head of the China Meteorological Administration, issued the following assessment in 2009, though this opinion is now over a decade old:
The Tibetan Plateau contains the largest area of low-latitude glaciers and is particularly vulnerable to global warming. Over the past five decades, 80% of the glaciers in the Tibetan Plateau have retreated, losing 4.5% of their combined areal coverage.

See also 
 Annexation of Tibet by the People's Republic of China
 Bayan Har block
 Central Tibetan Administration
 Geography of Tibet
 Geology of the Himalaya
 Tibet (1912–1951)
 Tibetan culture
 Tibetan sovereignty debate
 Tibetan diaspora

References

Citations

Sources

External links

 ON THINNER ICE 如履薄冰 (by GRIP, Asia Society and MediaStorm)
 The Third Pole: Understanding Asia's Water Crisis
 The End of Earth's Summer
 Long Rivers and Distant Sources
 "Roof of the Earth" Offers Clues About How Our Planet Was Shaped 
 Plateau Perspectives (international NGO)
 Leaf morphology and the timing of the rise of the Tibetan Plateau
 
 Protected areas of the Tibetan Plateau region
 
 Photos of Tibetan nomads
 "Roof of the Earth" Offers Clues About How Our Planet Was Shaped
 Contemporary lifestyle and language learning center from Tibet lhasa, the official language of Tibetan. podcast.
 Tibetan History-The true history of any region cannot be fully understood without knowing the basic characteristics of a region and of its inhabitants

 
Plateaus of Asia
Plateaus of China
Plateaus of India
Plateaus of Pakistan
Landforms of Tibet
Landforms of Jammu and Kashmir
Landforms of Ladakh
Landforms of Central Asia
Landforms of East Asia
Landforms of South Asia
Regions of Asia
Montane ecology
Physiographic provinces
Geology of the Himalaya